Armed Police Battalion School & College is a Higher secondary school at Uttara in the city of Dhaka in Bangladesh.

History
The school was founded on 1 January 1996 by Mr. Moinuddin Chisty, a Police High Level Officer of Armed Police Battalion which is a part of Bangladesh Police. It is run by police administration, 5th Armed Police Battalion.

Sports activities
Every year sports day is observed and many events are played by students as competition. APBnSC takes part in Inter High school Football Championship and Inter High school Cricket Championship.

References

External links
 Facebook page

Educational institutions of Uttara
Education in Bangladesh
High schools in Bangladesh
1996 establishments in Bangladesh